The Balata-Tufari National Forest is a national forest in the state of Amazonas, Brazil.
It was created to support sustainable extraction of forest products such as timber subject to restrictions and regulations defined by law or the responsible agency, ICMBio.

Location

The Balata-Tufari National Forest covers parts of the municipalities of Canutama (90.85%) and Tapauá (9.15%) in the state of Amazonas.
It is bounded by the Purus River to the west, by the first section of the Trans-Amazonian Highway (BR-230) from Lábrea to Humaitá which cuts across its southern end, and by BR-319 to the east.
The Mucuim River runs through the forest, flowing north from the Mapinguari National Park, which lies to the south of BR-230.
The Mucuim is joined within the forest by the Açuã River, which rises in the Mapinguari National Park.
2.47% of the national forest's area overlaps with the Mapinguari National Park.

The national forest is in the Amazon biome.
It contains 91.44% open rainforest, 6.45% dense rainforest and 2.11% contact between savannah and rainforest.
About 2000 families live in the forest, mostly farmers who own or lease small plots.
The  Balata-Tufari National Forest and the nearby Iquiri National Forest have great potential not only for sustainable extraction of timber but also for products such as oils, resins, nuts, seeds and fruits.

History

The Balata-Tufari National Forest was created by decree on 17 February 2005 and is administered by the Chico Mendes Institute for Biodiversity Conservation (ICMBio).
It is classed as IUCN protected area category VI (protected area with sustainable use of natural resources) with the objective of sustainable multiple use of forest resources and scientific research, with emphasis on methods for sustainable exploitation of native forests.

The advisory council was formed on 14 December 2010.
An ordinance of 9 January 2012 provided for a consistent and integrated approach to preparing management plans for the conservation units in the BR-319 area of influence. These are the Abufari Biological Reserve, Cuniã Ecological Station, Nascentes do Lago Jari and Mapinguari national parks, Balata-Tufari, Humaitá and Iquiri national forests, and the  Lago do Capanã-Grande, Rio Ituxi, Médio Purus and Lago do Cuniã extractive reserves.

Notes

Sources

2005 establishments in Brazil
National parks of Brazil
Protected areas of Amazonas (Brazilian state)